The Chandler Bridge Formation is a geologic formation in South Carolina. It preserves fossils dating back to the Chattian (Late Oligocene) of the Paleogene period, corresponding to the Arikareean in the NALMA classification. The formation overlies the Ashley Formation and is overlain by the Edisto Formation.

Vertebrate paleofauna

Mammals

Reptiles

Fish

See also 
 List of fossiliferous stratigraphic units in South Carolina
 Paleontology in South Carolina

References

Bibliography 
 

Geologic formations of South Carolina
Paleogene geology of South Carolina
Oligocene Series of North America
Chattian Stage
Arikareean
Sandstone formations
Shallow marine deposits
Fossiliferous stratigraphic units of North America
Paleontology in South Carolina